The , which is Japanese for "falcon-people", were a people of ancient Japan who lived in the Satsuma and Ōsumi regions of southern Kyushu during the Nara period. They frequently resisted Yamato rule. The name also came into use by samurai as a title, . In modern times, Hayato is a Japanese male given name.

History and culture 
The Hayato might have been the same as the Kumaso group of around the same time, but while the Kumaso are mentioned in the more legendary portions of the Nihon Shoki, the Hayato are recorded in various historical texts until the beginning of the Heian period. Though the Kumaso are generally portrayed as rebellious, the Hayato are listed among the attendants of emperors and princes from as early as Emperor Nintoku's reign. This, along with a mention of Hayato crying before the grave of Emperor Yūryaku after his death, suggests that the Hayato were naturalized as personal servants by the late 7th century.

Even after pledging allegiance to the Japanese court, the Hayato continued to resist its rule. After the establishment of Ōsumi Province in 713, the Ōsumi Hayato fought back in 720 with the Hayato Rebellion, but were defeated in 721 by an army led by Ōtomo no Tabito. The Handen-Shūju system was implemented in their lands in 800. The population of Yamato immigrants in Kagoshima prefecture in the early 8th century has been estimated at around 9,000 people and one-seventh of the total population. By this estimate, the Hayato population of the time can be calculated as consisting of around 54,000 people (not including Hayato emigrants to Honshū).

The Hayato were made to emigrate to the Kinai region, and were active in the protection of the court, the arts, sumo, and bamboo work. Many lived in Yamashiro Province, in the south of modern Kyoto. There remains an area called  in Kyōtanabe, Kyoto, where many Ōsumi Hayato lived. These were the Hayato governed by the Hayato-shi.

The language spoken by the Hayato is not known, except for two words and several personal names documented in contemporary sources. Based on this material, it has been proposed that the Hayato may have been of Austronesian origin. Their culture is also believed to be unique from those of other regions of Japan. An excavation of Heijō Palace discovered wooden shields with a distinctive reverse-S-shaped marking. These shields match those described in the Engishiki, which the Hayato used in court ceremonial functions. The Hayato had roles in various state ceremonies, including those for the new year, imperial enthronement, and visiting foreign officials.

According to the ancient records of Hizen province, the Gotō Islands were also inhabited by a people resembling the Hayato.

Another large group of tunnel tombs is located near the Ōsumi area of Kyotanabe. Because of the proximity and because the gravelly soil of the area is not suited to such tombs, these may also be associated with the Hayato.

In Japanese mythology, the deity Umisachihiko is considered the ancestor of the ruler of the Ata Hayato. The Hayato Dance may be intended to portray Umisachihiko's pain at being outdone by his younger brother Yamasachihiko.

Regional distribution 
, or Satsuma Hayato
A Hayato tribe who lived on the Satsuma Peninsula. Before the establishment of Satsuma Province, the area was known as Ata. The Nihon Shoki'''s section on 682 calls them the Ata Hayato, while the section of the Shoku Nihongi on the year 709 refers to them as the Satsuma Hayato.

A Hayato tribe who lived in the northern Ōsumi Peninsula, or by another theory the Kimotsuki plain region. They are mentioned in Nihon Shoki article on 682.

A Hayato tribe who lived in Tane Province. In 702, the court dispatched an army and conquered the region.

A Hayato tribe who lived on the Koshikijima Islands. They are mentioned in the Shoku Nihongi's section on 769.

A Hayato tribe who lived in Hyūga Province. However, this was before the separation of Ōsumi province from Hyūga Province in 713. The history of Usa Shrine records that later, in 719, the Ōsumi and Hyūga Hayato attacked Japan, perhaps a precursor to the rebellion of 720.

Skeletal findings 
Anthropological research on human skeletons of the Kofun period on southern Kyushu has shown that male skeletons found inland differ from those on the Miyazaki plain. Inland skeletons resembled those of Jōmon people and northwestern Kyushu Yayoi people, and some groups on the plain also resembled northern Kyushu Yayoi people. Additionally, skeletons excavated from late Yayoi-period ruins on Tanegashima are smaller than those found on Kyushu, and show signs of artificial cranial deformation.

Notes

References 

Nara period
Tribes of ancient Japan